Epigynum auritum is a plant species in the genus Epigynum. It is native to Yunnan Province in China, as well as Assam State in India, Laos, Thailand, Myanmar (Burma), and the Peninsular region of Malaysia.

The flavanol epigeoside (Catechin-3-O-alpha-L-rhamnopyranosyl-(1-4)-beta-D-glucopyranosyl-(1-6)-beta-D-glucopyranoside) can be isolated from the rhizomes of E. auritum.

References

External links

Apocyneae
Flora of Asia
Plants described in 1916